Christopher Campbell (9 December 1908 – 1972) was an Irish painter. His work was part of the painting event in the art competition at the 1948 Summer Olympics. Campbell studied at the Dublin Metropolitan School of Art. As well as a painter, Campbell also worked with stained glass. He worked in Harry Clarke's studio in the 1930s, and his work was used in stained glass windows in several churches in Ireland. He also taught art at the Kilkenny Technical School. His younger brother, Laurence, was a sculptor.

References

1908 births
1972 deaths
20th-century Irish painters
Irish male painters
Olympic competitors in art competitions
Painters from Dublin (city)
20th-century Irish male artists